David Charles Guthrie (1861 – 12 January 1918) was a British Liberal Party politician who served as Member of Parliament for South Northamptonshire in the 25th Parliament between 1892 and 1895.

Guthrie was first elected at the 1892 general election.

References

External links 
 David Guthrie on Hansard

UK MPs 1892–1895
Liberal Party (UK) MPs for English constituencies
1861 births
1918 deaths
People from Northamptonshire